Lange is a crater on Mercury.  It was named by the IAU in 2009 after American photographer Dorothea Lange. 

Lange appears to have been flooded by lava, with only faint traces remaining of a buried inner ring.  It is one of 110 peak ring basins on Mercury.

References

Impact craters on Mercury